Nikonorov is a Russian masculine surname, its feminine counterpart is Nikonorova. Notable people with the surname include:

 Boris Nikonorov (1939–2015), Russian Olympic boxer
 Kirill Nikonorov (born 1990), Russian ice hockey player

Russian-language surnames